Zumtor is a Swiss German surname, which means "to the gate". Notable people with the surname include:

Paul Zumthor (1915–1995), Swiss medievalist, literary historian, and linguist
Peter Zumthor (born 1943), Swiss architect

German-language surnames
Swiss-German surnames